Bonnie Urquhart Gruenberg (born August 1963) is an photographer, author, artist, and certified nurse-midwife. She was raised in Connecticut and earned degrees in nursing at Southern Vermont College and University of Pennsylvania. She worked as an urban emergency medical technician/paramedic in Connecticut from 1988 to 2000. Her published works cluster within two primary topics: wild horses and midwifery/childbearing. She is the author of Birth Emergency Skills Training TM and the creator of its associated workshops. She is also the creator of the Atlantic Wild Horse Trail, a virtual route that links the feral horse herds of the Atlantic coast into a chain of vacation spots and day-trip destinations.

Publications

Midwifery/Childbearing Topics

Birth Emergency Skills Training: Manual for Out of Hospital Providers (Birth Guru Publications, 2008). Winner of the 2009 Benjamin Franklin Award for Best E-Book; and the 2009 Next Generation Indie Book Awards Winner E-book Non-fiction.

Essentials of Prehospital Maternity Care(Prentice Hall, 2005)

The Midwife's Journal: Birth Log and Memory Book (Birth Guru Publications, 2009)

Wild Horse Topics

The Wild Horse Dilemma: Conflicts and Controversies of the Atlantic Coast Herds (Quagga Press, 2015).
"Simply the best work on the subject" Third place grand prize 2015 Next Generation Indie Book Awards 
Winner: Eric Hoffer Book Award Best Reference 2015 

Wild Horse Vacations: Your Guide to the Atlantic Horse Wild Trail Volume 1: Assateague, MD, Chincoteague, VA, Corolla NC

Wild Horse Vacations: Your Guide to the Atlantic Wild Horse Trail Volume 2: Ocracoke, NC, Shackleford Banks, NC, Cumberland Island, GA

The Hoofprints Guide Series

 The Hoofprints Guide to the Wild Horses of Assateague (Quagga Press, 2015)
 The Hoofprints Guide to the Wild Horses of Chincoteague National Wildlife Refuge (Quagga Press, 2015)
 The Hoofprints Guide to the  Wild Horses of Corolla (Quagga Press, 2015)
 The Hoofprints Guide to the Wild Horses of Ocracoke Island (Quagga Press, 2015)
 The Hoofprints Guide to the Wild Horses of Shackleford Banks and Vicinity (Quagga Press, 2015)
 The Hoofprints Guide to the Wild Horses of Cumberland Island (Quagga Press, 2015)

Hoofprints in the Sand: Wild Horses of the Atlantic Coast. (Eclipse Press, 2002)

Media Links

The Chincoteague Ponies of Assateague Island, VA E-book download

http://bonniegphoto.com/

http://www.bonniegruenberg.com/

https://yourshot.nationalgeographic.com/photos/1230882/

References

1963 births
Living people
American midwives
University of Pennsylvania School of Nursing alumni
American women writers
American nurses
American women nurses
Advanced practice registered nurses
21st-century American women